The following is a list of the chapters and colonies of the Lambda Chi Alpha Fraternity, an international men's collegiate fraternity, ordered by name; activating the column headings will sort the list by installation year, institution, location, or status.

A chapter is an organization of members of the fraternity attached to an institution or geographic location which has received a charter authorizing it to operate as the local unit of Lambda Chi Alpha. A colony is a local group which is being organized or reorganized and has not yet met the standards for a charter. Most newly issued charters go to colonies established by the General Fraternity, although the majority of charters were issued to petitioning local societies.

In the early days of the fraternity in the early 20th century, founder Warren A. Cole issued charters to so-called picked delegations, groups of correspondents who were interested in forming a fraternity chapter but who had not yet organized themselves. In 1939, Lambda Chi Alpha merged with Theta Kappa Nu and absorbed 28 active chapters, plus seven on campuses where Lambda Chi Alpha was already represented.

Naming
Lambda Chi Alpha chapters are known as subordinate Zetas, or simply Zetas. As such, the Alpha chapter at Boston University, the fraternity's first chapter, is referred to as Alpha Zeta. Zetas are identified by Greek letters in a unique scrambled alphabet naming scheme.

At the fraternity's inception, founder Warren A. Cole assigned Greek letters to petitioning groups that had not yet been chartered. Not all of these groups were chartered. As a result, the first seven chapters were designated Α, Γ, Ε, Ζ, Ι, Λ, and Β, in that order. John E. Mason created a 24-word mnemonic device with words representing each Greek letter once; the first seven words were in the order that the chapters were already named.
A good energetic Zeta is Lambda's boast; ‘Strength from Delta Pi’, our motto, to each through union; excellent character only, knowing no retreating steps.
Therefore, the chapters are named in the order: Α, Γ, Ε, Ζ, Ι, Λ, Β, Σ, Φ, Δ, Π, Ο, Μ, Τ, Η, Θ, Υ, Ξ, Χ, Ω, Κ, Ν, Ρ, Ψ. After the twenty-fourth chapter, the sequence was continued with a prefix and hyphen (Α-Α, Α-Γ, Α-Ε, ... Γ-Α, Γ-Γ, Γ-Ε, ... Ε-A, etc.)

When Theta Kappa Nu merged with Lambda Chi Alpha in 1939, former Theta Kappa Nu chapters were assigned chapter designations prefixed with Θ, Κ, or Ν. The second letter of their chapter name was assigned in the order mentioned above and applied to the chapters in order of their precedence in Theta Kappa Nu; e.g., Theta Kappa Nu's Alpha chapter at Howard College (now Samford University) became Theta Alpha Zeta. On 21 campuses, chapters of both Lambda Chi Alpha and Theta Kappa Nu existed. In those cases, the chapter of Lambda Chi Alpha kept its original designation, and the letter which would have been assigned to the chapter of Theta Kappa Nu was permanently retired. A singular exception is the chapter at Georgia Tech in Atlanta, Βeta-Κappa Zeta, which was named in recognition of its existence as a chapter of Beta Kappa, a national fraternity whose other existing chapters merged with Theta Chi in 1942.

Chapters

† Theta Kappa Nu charter year.
‡ Canadian chapter.

Colonies
These colonies have never received a charter from Lambda Chi Alpha.

‡ Canadian colony.

See also
Lambda Chi Alpha
List of Lambda Chi Alpha brothers

References

External links
Lambda Chi Alpha International Fraternity — official home page.
Lambda Chi Alpha Chapter Listing

 
Lambda Chi Alpha